Arjan Peço (born 26 April 1975) is an Albanian football coach and former player who was the head coach of Basel U-21 and currently the first-team coach for Ligue 1 club Nice.

Club career
During a playing than span 16 years, Peço played for Dinamo and Partizani in Albania, and Delémont, Yverdon, Concordia and Laufen in Switzerland.

International career
Peço made his debut for Albania in an April 1996 friendly match against Bosnia and earned a total of 13 caps, scoring no goals. His final international was a January 2002 Bahrain Tournament match against Bahrain.

Managerial career
Since 2011 he has been working for Basel in the academy. In summer 2017 he was appointed head coach of Basel U-21. He left the post in 2020.

Honours 
Partizani
Albanian Cup: 1996–97

References

External links

1975 births
Living people
Footballers from Tirana
Albanian footballers
Albania international footballers
Albanian expatriate footballers
Expatriate footballers in Switzerland
Albanian expatriate sportspeople in Switzerland
Association football midfielders
FK Dinamo Tirana players
FK Partizani Tirana players
SR Delémont players
Yverdon-Sport FC players
FC Concordia Basel players
FC Laufen players
Albanian football managers
FC Basel non-playing staff
OGC Nice non-playing staff